Alfred Skinner may refer to:

 Alf Skinner (1894–1961), Canadian ice hockey right winger
 Alfred Ford Skinner (1862–1931), American politician from New Jersey